Martensdale-St Marys Community School District is a rural public school district headquartered in Martensdale, Iowa.

The district is split between western Warren County and eastern Madison County. Communities in its service area, in addition to Martensdale, include St. Marys and Bevington.

The district mascot is the Blue Devils, and their colors are royal and gold..

Schools
The district operates two schools, located on a single campus in Martensdale:
 Martensdale Elementary School
 Martensdale-St Marys Jr/Sr High School

Martensdale-St Marys High School

Athletics
The Blue Devils compete in the Pride of Iowa Conference in the following sports:

 Girls Wrestling
 Volleyball
 Cross Country
 Basketball
 Girls' 2011 Class 1A State Champions
 Wrestling
 Golf
 Soccer
 Track and Field
 Baseball
 5-time State Champions (1941, 2004, 2010, 2011, 2012)
 Softball
 2012 Class 1A State Champions

See also
List of school districts in Iowa
List of high schools in Iowa

References

External links
 Martensdale-St Marys Community School District

School districts in Iowa
Education in Warren County, Iowa
Education in Madison County, Iowa